Christopher Alexander Terry (born August 8, 1975) is a former American football offensive tackle who played in the National Football League. Terry was drafted by the Carolina Panthers in 1999, released in 2002 and played three seasons with the Seattle Seahawks.

On October 26, 2006, the Kansas City Chiefs signed Terry to a two-year contract and played with Kansas City until week 15 of the 2007 season.

On January 27, 2010 Terry was booked into jail in Clark County, IN on charges of class A felony dealing cocaine and class C felony possession of cocaine along with charges of operating while intoxicated by refusal, resisting law enforcement, possession of a handgun without a permit and driving with a suspended license.

References

1975 births
Living people
Players of American football from Jacksonville, Florida
American football offensive tackles
Georgia Bulldogs football players
Carolina Panthers players
Seattle Seahawks players
Kansas City Chiefs players